Chessell is a hamlet on the Isle of Wight, England, towards the west in an area known as the Back of the Wight on the B3401 road. Public transport used to be provided by Southern Vectis on route 1. It is the location of the Chessell Pottery Barns, a popular tourist attraction.

References

External links
Photographs of Chessell and surrounding area

Hamlets on the Isle of Wight